Canariella is a genus of small air-breathing land snails, terrestrial pulmonate gastropod mollusks in the family Canariellidae, the hairy snails and their allies.

Species
Species within the genus Canariella include 11 species:
 Canariella hispidula (Lamarck, 1822) - type species
 Canariella leprosa
 Canariella planaria (Lamarck, 1822)
 Canariella pthonera

References

External links

 
Gastropod genera
Taxonomy articles created by Polbot